Burdick may refer to:

People
Anna Lalor Burdick (1869–1944), Iowan educator 
Bob Burdick (1936–2007), former NASCAR driver
Burrows Burdick (1823–1899), American physician and Wisconsin state Representative
Chris Burdick (born 1951), American politician, Member of the New York State Assembly
Eugene Burdick (1918–1965), novelist
Eugene A. Burdick (1912–2000), judge
Francis Marion Burdick (1845–1920), American professor of law
Harold P. Burdick (1893/1894-1978), American journalist, actor, and writer
Jefferson Burdick (1900–1963), trading card collector, cataloger, and historian
Jocelyn Burdick (1922–2019), US Senator briefly during 1992
Lloyd Burdick  (1909–1945), American football player
Natalia Hussey-Burdick (born 1989), American politician, Member of the Hawaii State House of Representatives
Peyton Burdick (born 1997), American baseball player
Quentin Burdick (1908–1992), husband of Jocelyn Burdick, US Representative and Senator from North Dakota
Richard Burdick (1929–2018), American Boy Scouts commissioner
Usher L. Burdick (1879–1960), father of Quentin L. Burdick, also a US Representative
Walter Burdick (1893-1982), American farmer and politician

Places
Antarctica
Burdick South Peak, a mountain of Livingston Island
Burdick West Peak, a mountain of Livingston Island

United States
Burdick, Indiana, an unincorporated community
Burdick, Kansas, an unincorporated community
Burdick Township, Perkins County, South Dakota, a township

Other uses
Burdick v. United States

See also
The Mysteries of Harris Burdick, picture book by Chris Van Allsburg